These are the late night schedules on all three networks for each calendar season beginning September 1968. All times are Eastern/Pacific.

NET is not included, as member television stations have local flexibility over most of their schedules and broadcast times for network shows may vary, ABC is not included on the weekend schedules (as the network do not offer late night programs of any kind on weekends).

Talk/Variety shows are highlighted in yellow, Local News & Programs are highlighted in white.

Monday-Friday

Saturday/Sunday

By network

ABC

Returning Series
The Joey Bishop Show

NBC

Returning Series
The Tonight Show Starring Johnny Carson
The Weekend Tonight Show

United States late night network television schedules
1968 in American television
1969 in American television